Zopyrus  (Zōpyros) may refer to:
 Zopyrus (6th century BC), a Persian satrap of Babylon mentioned in Herodotus' Histories
 , grandson of the satrap and son of Megabyzus and Amytis
 Zopyrus of Tarentum, an engineer and Pythagorean (5th century BC) credited with the invention of two advanced forms of the gastraphetes and the protagonist of the novel The Arrows of Hercules (1965)
 , author of three Orphic poems whose authorship is also ascribed to Brontinus, The Net, The Robe and The Krater (possibly the same as Zopyrus of Tarentum, or possibly as early as the 6th century BC)
 Zopyrus (physiognomist) (5th century BC), a physiognomist (possibly the same as the Thracian tutor of Alcibiades mentioned in the Platonic First Alcibiades, 122b)(see also, Cicero's De Fato V)
 Zopyrus (dialogue), a dialogue by Phaedo of Elis, in which Zopyrus the physiognomist practices his art on Socrates
 Zopyros perikaiomenos (Zopyrus on Fire), a comedy by Strattis
 Zopyrus of Clazomenae (early 3rd century BC), credited with introducing the rhetorical concept of stasis
  (ca. 300 BC?), proponent of singing Homeric poetry in the Aeolic dialect and probable author of a history (FGrHist 494), The Foundation of Miletus, cited in the scholium to Iliad 10.274
 Zopyrus, a soldier of Antigonus II Gonatas (3rd century BC) said to have killed Pyrrhus of Epirus
  (1st century BC)
 Zopyrus (physician) (1st century BC), teacher of Apollonius of Citium at Alexandria
  (1st century AD), a physician and acquaintance of Scribonius Largus, from Gordium (or perhaps Gortyn), possibly to be identified with the Epicurean speaker in Plutarch's Symposiaca
 Zopyrus (Bishop of Barca), present at the First Council of Nicaea in AD 325: see Cyrenaica and Barca
 Aurelios Zopyros (4th century AD), the last reported athlete at the Ancient Olympic Games